Marco Castro (born November 30, 1980) is an American, film director, screenwriter, and make-up artist.

Biography

Castro was born in Lima, Peru, of Native Peruvian and Spanish descent. He is a Filmmaker, and Creative Director. Castro’s films are a solid yet beautiful statement on young Hispanic culture. The subjects are living their “American” dreams. He is a long-time collaborator of Willy Chavarria and Francois Nars and their brands.

Castro has also worked with filmmaker Pedro Almodovar and photographer Nan Goldin, which greatly influenced his work. Castro's films Officially Selected in San Diego Latino Film Festival, Palm Springs International Film Festival, Aesthetica Short Film Festival, Malaga Film Festival, Guanajuato International Film Festival, Berlin Commercial, New York Independent Film Festival, Canadian Fashion Film Festival, among others. Castro lives and works in Brooklyn, New York.

Filmography

"Comunidad" (2021) Documentary  fashion Film
"To be an American" (2020) Documentary  fashion Film
"We, Mexicans" (2019) Docu-style fashion Film for Showstudio 
"Any Day Now" (2016) Fashion Film for Elena Benarroch
If I Hear You Talk Aposthrophes Again (2012) (music video) 
Red Suite(2012) (fashion film)
Marlowe (2010)  
Slice (2010)
Radar The Son(s)(2010) (music video) 
Glen or Glenda (2007)
Manuela (2006) 
Amar i yo (2006)
Fanatica (2005)
Oferta (2005)
Sodomia (2004)
El Amor (2003)
La Lluvia (2003)

See also
List of famous Peruvian Directors

External links

References 

https://web.archive.org/web/20110727191714/http://www.psfilmfest.org/festival/film/detail.aspx?id=18598&FID=26
https://web.archive.org/web/20130601112314/http://primped.ninemsn.com.au/blogs/the-beauty-desk/meet-marco-castro-francois-nars-right-hand-man-oh-and-penelope-cruzs-go-to-makeup-guy

American film directors
1980 births
Living people
Peruvian emigrants to the United States